A paper cut occurs when a piece of paper or other thin, sharp material slices a person's skin, often the upper part of the finger, and often the index finger. Notably, "paper" cuts can also be caused by other thin, stiff, and abrasive materials other than just paper. Paper cuts can be highly painful, even though they may bleed very little, if at all.

Although a loose sheet of paper is usually too soft to cut, it can be very thin (sometimes as thin as a razor edge), thus being able to exert high levels of pressure, enough to cause a cut. Paper cuts are most often caused by paper sheets that are strongly fastened together (such as brand new sheet of paper out of a ream), because one single sheet might be dislocated from the rest. Thus all the other sheets are holding this dislocated sheet in position, making it stiff enough to act as a razor.

Paper cuts can be painful as they can stimulate a large number of skin surface nociceptors (pain receptors) in a very small area of the skin. Because the shallow cut does not bleed as much, the pain receptors are left open to the air, causing continued pain. This is exacerbated by irritation caused by the fibers in the paper itself, which may be coated in chemicals such as bleach. Additionally, most paper cuts occur in the fingers, which have a greater concentration of sensory receptors than the rest of the body.

References

External links 
 A Moment of Science: Paper Cuts 
 Why are paper cuts so painful in relation to their size and appearance?

Skin conditions resulting from physical factors